Buddha is a 2004 historical nonfiction book by Karen Armstrong. It is an examination of the life, times, and lasting influence of Siddhartha Gautama, with core tenets of Buddhism introduced throughout history.

References

2004 non-fiction books
Works by Karen Armstrong